Parker Space  (born December 4, 1968) is an American Republican Party politician, and owner of Space Farms Zoo and Museum. Space has served in the New Jersey General Assembly since March 2013, where he represents the 24th Legislative District.

Personal life 
Space graduated in 1987 from High Point Regional High School.

He is a farmer and restaurant owner who also owns Space Farms Zoo and Museum in the Beemerville section of Wantage Township in Sussex County. He has served with the Wantage Fire Department as a volunteer firefighter since 1989 and the department's chief 2001–2002.

Sussex County Board of Chosen Freeholders 
Space was appointed to the Sussex County Board of Chosen Freeholders in 2010 following the appointment of Hal Wirths to head the New Jersey Department of Labor and Workforce Development. Space won a full three-year term in the 2010 general election and was chosen as Freeholder Director in 2013.

New Jersey Assembly 
Space served as freeholder until his appointment to the General Assembly filling a vacancy left by the resignation of Gary R. Chiusano in 2013.  Chiusano was appointed to the vacant position of Sussex County Surrogate, and Space was chosen by a convention called of party delegates from municipalities to fill the vacancy per New Jersey state law. Space received 103 of the 158 delegate votes cast, defeating Bader Qarmout, John Wroblewski, and Mark Quick. He was elected to his own full term in November 2013, then again in 2015 and 2017.

Committee assignments 
Committee assignments for the current session are:

Agriculture and Food Security
Labor

District 24 
Each of the 40 districts in the New Jersey Legislature has one representative in the New Jersey Senate and two members in the New Jersey General Assembly. The representatives from the 24th District for the 2022—23 Legislative Session are:
 Senator Steve Oroho (R)
 Assemblyman Parker Space (R)
 Assemblyman Hal Wirths (R)

Controversies 
Space was criticized for playing Solitaire on the job during a debate on minimum wages. In a candidate forum in October 2015, Space was quoted as saying: "There is nothing better than an unregistered gun, believe me." In August 2017, Space was criticized for posting a photo of himself and his wife posing in front of a Confederate flag, which was superimposed with a picture of Hank Williams Jr.'s face. The inscription on the flag read: "If the South would've won, we would've had it made."

On August 31, 2017, Space was recorded calling opponent Kate Matteson, saying "[...] And you can put that on the record. She is (an) elitist 1 percenter, an elitist who's a bitch. Gina (Gina Trish, Matteson's running mate), I've never met. I can't say anything bad about her. But Kate, I can. Because I know she's a bitch."

Electoral history

New Jersey Assembly

References

External links
 Assemblyman Parker Space (New Jersey Legislature official website)

1968 births
Living people
Mayors of places in New Jersey
County commissioners in New Jersey
Republican Party members of the New Jersey General Assembly
People from Wantage Township, New Jersey
Politicians from Sussex County, New Jersey
21st-century American politicians